The glass knifefish (Eigenmannia virescens) is a weakly electric freshwater fish found across South America. It is marketed as an aquarium fish.

Description 
The appendix on the body has black lines running through the bottom of the sides, with the most intense line running on the anal fin.

Like all members of its order, it is distinguished by its ability to produce electric fields. This is achieved by discharging an electric organ in the tail.

Distribution 
This species is widely distributed in the rivers of South America. Their range extends from the Magdalena River basin in Colombia to the Rio de La Plata in Argentina, including Peru, Bolivia, Paraguay, Uruguay, Brazil, Venezuela, Guyana, and Suriname.

See also 
 Feature detection

References

External links 

 
 Aquatic Community: Glass Knife Fish - Eigenmannia virescens

Sternopygidae
Freshwater fish of South America
Freshwater fish of Colombia
Magdalena River
Fish described in 1847
Taxa named by Achille Valenciennes